The Little Princess is a 1939 American drama film directed by Walter Lang. The screenplay by Ethel Hill and Walter Ferris is loosely based on the 1905 novel A Little Princess by Frances Hodgson Burnett. The film was the first Shirley Temple movie to be filmed completely in Technicolor. It was also her last major success as a child star.

Although it maintained the novel's Victorian London setting, the film introduced several new characters and storylines and used the Second Boer War and the siege of Mafeking as a backdrop to the action. Temple and Arthur Treacher had a musical number together, performing the song "Knocked 'Em in the Old Kent Road". Temple also appeared in an extended ballet sequence. The film's ending was drastically different from the book.

In 1968, the film entered the public domain in the United States because the claimants did not renew its copyright registration in the 28th year after publication.

Plot

Captain Crewe, called to fight in the Second Boer War, has to leave his daughter Sara (Shirley Temple) with her pony at Miss Minchin's School for Girls. With all the money Captain Crewe can offer, Miss Minchin gives Sara a fancy, private room.

Although worried about her father, Sara is distracted by riding lessons. It is during these riding lessons that Sara helps contrive meetings between Miss Rose, her teacher, and Mr. Geoffrey, the riding instructor, who is also the grandson of the mean-spirited next door neighbor, Lord Wickham. Mr. Geoffrey decides to volunteer to fight in the war and asks Miss Rose to marry him before leaving. Sara has him to tea before he ships out, using the excuse to convince Miss Minchin, but she catches Geoffrey and Rose together, not allowing them to say a proper goodbye. Sara later hears news that Mafeking is free and expects her father will soon come home. Miss Minchin throws Sara a lavish birthday party on the request of her father. During the party, Captain Crewe's solicitor arrives with the sad news that Captain Crewe has died and his real estate, the basis for his wealth, has been confiscated. Miss Minchin ends Sara's party abruptly. Without her father's financial support, Sara becomes a servant, now working at the school she used to attend. Sara gains new solace in a friendship with Ram Dass, Lord Wickham's servant.  She also receives support from Miss Minchin's brother Bertie, who does not agree with her treatment. Miss Minchin confiscates a letter from Mr. Geoffrey to Rose and fires her. She intervenes with Geoffrey's grandfather who vows to never speak to him again. 

In her new role, Sara gets hungrier and more tired from her arduous duties and sneaks off to veterans' hospitals, convinced her father is not dead. After a string of episodes, including a performance of the film's most well-known song "Knocked 'em in the Old Kent Road" with Bertie, Sara is at her wits end. Things start to worsen, when Sara gets into an argument with Miss Minchin, who cannot tolerate her faith in believing her father is still alive and tries forcing her to face reality. She is taunted by Lavinia the next day, eventually causing her to lose her temper and dump ashes on her. Miss Minchin arrives in the attic to punish Sara for "hurting" Lavinia. She discovers blankets, food and other items that Ram Dass and Lord Wickham left Sara, assumes they are stolen, and locks her in the attic, calling the police. Sara escapes and runs to the hospital with Minchin in hot pursuit.

Meanwhile, the hospital is preparing to transfer a newly arrived unknown patient, who is unable to communicate except to repeatedly say, "Sara, Sara"; it is Captain Crewe. Sara bursts in upon a visit by Queen Victoria, who grants her permission to search for her father. During her search, she is reunited with a wounded Mr. Geoffrey and Miss Rose. Hiding from Miss Minchin and the police, she happens upon her father in the waiting room. Initially he doesn't respond to her but her cries bring him out of his stupor. 

A staff member announces Sara has found her father, and Miss Minchin exclaims: "Captain Crewe is alive?!" to which her brother retorts, "Of course he's alive! How could she find him if he wasn't alive?" The film ends with Sara helping her father stand as the Queen departs, smiling at Sara on the way out. Sara and her father, later rescue Becky and adopt her and their fortune gets restored and the family move to a new home in London.

Cast

 Shirley Temple as Sara Crewe
 Richard Greene as Geoffrey Hamilton
 Anita Louise as Rose
 Ian Hunter as Captain Reginald Crewe
 Cesar Romero as Ram Dass
 Arthur Treacher as Hubert "Bertie" Minchin
 Mary Nash as Mistress Amanda Minchin
 Sybil Jason as Becky
 Miles Mander as Lord Wickham
 Marcia Mae Jones as Lavinia
 Deidre Gale as Jessie
 Ira Stevens as Ermengarde
 E. E. Clive as Mr. Barrows
 Beryl Mercer as Queen Victoria
 Eily Malyon as Mrs. O'Connell the Cook
 Rita Paige as Minnie the Cook's Helper
 Clyde Cook as Attendant
  Keith Kenneth as Bobbie
 Will Stanton as a Groom
 Harry Allen as a Groom
 Holmes Herbert as a Doctor
  Evan Thomas as a Doctor
 Guy Bellis as a Doctor
  Kenneth Hunter as General
  Lionel Braham as Colonel

Source:

Production

After filming was completed, Daryl Zanuck of Fox requested additional scenes shot totalling $300,000 pushing the cost over $1 million. This made the movie the most expensive Shirley Temple film to date.

As part of the preparation for the movie, great pains were taken to make sure every aspect of it was true to 1899 and England, the time period and setting of the story. Props such as the doll had to be to the exact specifications of a doll made at that time. Clothing also had to be precise. Production was held up after it was discovered that one of the costumes Temple wore used snap fasteners that were not invented until 1908.

During the scene where Temple dumps ashes on Marcia Mae Jones' character, the original plan was to do it in one take. Temple, however, who was angry about the attention received by Sybil Jason in a previous scene, wanted to repeat it after the first take, likely just to "let off steam", but when she asked director Lang for a second ash-dump take, he said it was not necessary.

For the ballet dance scene, Temple was trained by ballet dance instructor Ernest Belcher. Temple rented her pony Spunky to the studio to simply lie down in the stall. The artificial green coloration of the straw (which was green so it would show better in Technicolor) however caused the pony to become restless and resulted in him being removed and Temple losing his appearance fee.<ref>Black 1988, 257-258,260.<small font> Note — Black also states that in filming a scene where she was to pick up a small monkey belonging to Cesar Romero's character, the monkey was startled and bit her, causing her to require a tetanus shot. Black's recollection is mistaken: the monkey scene was in her earlier film, Heidi. Romero's character in Little Princess had a colorful pet bird, a macaw, not a monkey. Both films had some of the same actors, likely explaining the mistaken memory.</small font></ref>

As a way of fitting in with the rest of the crew, Temple wanted to have her own punch card for punching in and out of work for the day and was initially rebuffed. The director Lang eventually relented and gave her a card to use. IBM caught word of Temple's enthusiasm and provided a special custom-made punch card recorder embossed with her name along with punch cards with her photo on them. The machine sat unused while Temple continued using the regular machine. Her time cards were likewise ignored by the studio payroll person.

Reception
According to Variety: "Transposition of the Frances Hodgson Burnett several-generation favorite, Sara Crewe, is accomplished most successfully. The fairy-tale story is still saccharine to the nth degree, but once the basic premise is established, it rolls along acceptably. And, while the story has been changed for screen purposes, the general line is close enough".

Benjamin R. Crisler, who reviewed the film when it opened in New York City at Roxy Theatre, said:
"With any other child on earth, it is amazing to reflect, The Little Princess would stand out as one of the most glaring exhibits of pure hokum in screen history; with Mistress Temple, it may very well be, as Mr. Zanuck unflinchingly proclaims, the greatest picture with which Mr. Zanuck has ever been associated".

Janet Maslin, writing for The New York Times 44 years later, on the occasion of its VHS release by Media Home Entertainment, called it "antiquated enough to seem charming" and concludes that "[t]he movie's music, its corny but likable histrionics and its rousing patriotism (it was made in 1939) culminate in a happy ending sure to make even grown-up viewers cry".

References
Notes

External links

 
 
 
 
 

1939 films
1930s color films
20th Century Fox films
Aftermath of war
Films based on A Little Princess
Films directed by Walter Lang
Films scored by Cyril J. Mockridge
Films set in London
Films set in 1899
Films set in the 1890s
Films about educators
1930s English-language films
American drama films
Films produced by Darryl F. Zanuck
Cultural depictions of Queen Victoria on film
Articles containing video clips
1939 drama films
1930s American films